Sprouting is the natural process by which seeds or spores germinate and put out shoots, and already established plants produce new leaves or buds, or other  structures experience further growth.

In the field of nutrition, the term signifies the practice of germinating seeds (for example, mung beans or sunflower seeds) to be eaten raw or cooked, which is considered more nutritious.

Suitable seeds

All viable seeds can be sprouted, but some sprouts, such as kidney beans, should not be eaten raw.

Bean sprouts are a common ingredient across the world. They are particularly common in Eastern Asian cuisine. It typically takes one week for them to become fully grown. The sprouted beans are more nutritious than the original beans, and they require much less cooking time. There are two common types of bean sprouts:

 Mung bean sprouts, made from greenish-capped mung beans
 Soybean sprouts, made from yellow, large-grained soybeans

Common sprouts used as food include:
 Pulses/legumes (pea family) - bean sprouts:
alfalfa, clover, fenugreek, lentil, pea, chickpea (garbanzo), mung bean, and soy bean
 Cereals (grasses):
oat, wheat, maize (corn), rice, barley, and rye
 Pseudocereals:
quinoa, amaranth, and buckwheat
 Oilseeds:
sesame, sunflower, almond, hazelnut, hemp, linseed, and peanut
 Brassica (cabbage family):
broccoli, cabbage, watercress, mustard, mizuna, radish, and daikon (kaiware-daikon in Japanese cuisine), arugula, tatsoi, and turnip
 Umbelliferous vegetables (parsley family) - these may be used more as microgreens than sprouts:
carrot, celery, fennel, and parsley.
 Allium (onion family) - cannot distinguish sprouts from microgreens:
onion, leek, and green onion (me-negi in Japanese cuisine)
 Other vegetables and herbs:
spinach, lettuce, milk thistle, and lemon grass

Although whole oats can be sprouted, oat groats sold in food stores, which are dehulled and have been steamed or roasted to prevent rancidity, will not sprout. Whole oats may have an indigestible hull which makes them difficult or even unfit for human consumption. In the case of rice, the husk of the paddy is removed before sprouting. Brown rice is widely used for germination in Japan and other countries, becoming germinated brown rice. Quinoa in its natural state is very easy to sprout, but when polished, or pre-cleaned of its saponin coating (becoming whiter), it loses its power to germinate.

Sprouts of the family Solanaceae (tomato, potato, paprika, and aubergine/eggplant) and the family Polygonaceae (rhubarb) cannot be eaten raw, as they can be poisonous. Some sprouts can be cooked to remove the relevant toxin, while others cannot.

With all seeds, care should be taken that they are intended for sprouting or human consumption, rather than sowing. Seeds intended for sowing may be treated with toxic chemical dressings. Several countries, such as New Zealand, require that some varieties of imported edible seed be heat-treated, thus making it impossible for them to sprout.

The germination process

The germination process takes a few days and can be done at home manually, as a semi-automated process, or industrially on a large scale for commercial use.

Typically the seeds are first rinsed to remove soil, dirt and the mucilaginous substances produced by some seeds when they come in contact with water. Then they are soaked for from 20 minutes to 12 hours, depending on the type and size of the seed. The soaking increases the water content in the seeds and brings them out of quiescence. After draining and then rinsing seeds at regular intervals, the seeds then germinate, or sprout.

For home sprouting, the seeds are soaked (big seeds) or moistened (small), then left at room temperature in a sprouting vessel. Many different types of vessels can be used as a sprouting vessel. One type is a simple glass jar with a piece of cloth or nylon window screen secured over its rim. "Tiered" clear-plastic sprouters are commercially available, allowing a number of "crops" to be grown simultaneously.  By staggering sowings, a constant supply of young sprouts can be ensured. Any vessel used for sprouting must allow water to drain from it, because sprouts that sit in water will rot quickly. The seeds swell, may stick to the sides of the jar, and begin germinating within a day or two.

Another sprouting technique is to use a pulse drip method. The photo below on the right shows crimson clover sprouts grown on  urethane foam mats. It is a one-way watering system with micro-sprinklers providing intermittent pulses of fresh water to reduce the risk of bacterial cross-contamination with Salmonella and E. coli during the sprouting process.

Sprouts are rinsed two to four times a day, depending on the climate and the type of seed, to provide them with moisture and prevent them from souring. Each seed has its own ideal sprouting time. If left longer they will begin to develop leaves, and are then known as baby greens. A popular baby green is a sunflower after 7–10 days. Refrigeration can be used as needed to slow or halt the growth process of any sprout.

Common causes for sprouts becoming inedible:
 Seeds are not rinsed well enough before soaking
 Seeds are left in standing water after the initial soaking
 Seeds are allowed to dry out
 Temperature is too high or too low
 Dirty equipment
 Insufficient air flow
 Contaminated water source
 Poor germination rate

Mung beans can be sprouted either in light or dark conditions. Those sprouted in the dark will be crisper in texture and whiter, as in the case of commercially available Chinese Bean Sprouts, but these have less nutritional content than those grown in partial sunlight. Growing in full sunlight is not recommended, because it can cause the beans to overheat or dry out. Subjecting the sprouts to pressure, for example, by placing a weight on top of them in their sprouting container, will result in larger, crunchier sprouts similar to those sold in grocery stores.

A very effective way to sprout beans like lentils or azuki is in colanders.  Soak the beans in water for about 8 hours then place in the colander. Wash twice a day. The sprouted beans can be eaten raw or cooked.

Sprouting is also applied on a large scale to barley as a part of the malting process. Malted barley is an important ingredient in beer and is used in large quantities. Most malted barley is widely distributed among retail sellers in North America.

Many varieties of nuts, such as almonds and peanuts, can also be started in their growth cycle by soaking and sprouting, although because the sprouts are generally still very small when eaten, they are usually called "soaks".

Nutrition

Sprouts can be germinated at home or produced industrially. They are a prominent ingredient of a raw food diet and are common in Eastern Asian cuisine.

Sprouting, like cooking, reduces anti-nutritional compounds in raw legumes. Raw lentils, for example, contain lectins, anti-nutritional proteins which can be reduced by sprouting or cooking. Sprouting is also applied on a large scale to barley as a part of the malting process. A downside to consuming raw sprouts is that the process of germinating seeds can also be conducive to harmful bacterial growth.

Sprouts are rich in digestible energy, vitamins, minerals, amino acids, proteins, and phytochemicals, as these are necessary for a germinating plant to grow. These nutrients are also essential to human health.

The nutritional changes upon germination and sprouting are summarized below.

Chavan and Kadam (1989) concluded that
 "The desirable nutritional changes that occur during sprouting are mainly due to the breakdown of complex compounds into a more simple form, transformation into essential constituents and breakdown of nutritionally undesirable constituents. This is a reason why sprouts are also called pre-digested foods "
 "The metabolic activity of resting seeds increases as soon as they are hydrated during soaking. Complex biochemical changes occur during hydration and subsequent sprouting. The reserve chemical constituents, such as protein, starch and lipids, are broken down by enzymes into simple compounds that are used to make new compounds."
 "Sprouting grains causes increased activities of hydrolytic enzymes, improvements in the contents of total proteins, fat, certain essential amino acids, total sugars, B-group vitamins, and a decrease in dry matter, starch and anti-nutrients. The increased contents of protein, fat, fibre and total ash are only apparent and attributable to the disappearance of starch. However, improvements in amino acid composition, B-group vitamins, sugars, protein and starch digestibilities, and decrease in phytates and protease inhibitors are the metabolic effects of the sprouting process."

Increases in protein quality
Chavan and Kadam (1989) stated that:
Very complex qualitative changes are reported to occur during soaking and sprouting of seeds. The conversion of storage proteins of cereal grains into albumins and globulins during sprouting may improve the quality of cereal proteins. Many studies have shown an increase in the content of the amino acid Lysine with sprouting.

An increase in proteolytic activity during sprouting is desirable for nutritional improvement of cereals because it leads to hydrolysis of prolamins and the liberated amino acids such as glutamic and proline are converted to limiting amino acids such as lysine.

Increases in crude fibre content
Cuddeford (1989), based on data obtained by Peer and Leeson (1985) stated that:

In sprouted barley, crude fibre, a major constituent of cell walls, increases both in percentage and real terms, with the synthesis of structural carbohydrates, such as cellulose and hemicellulose.

Chung, et al. (1989) found that "the fibre content increased from 3.75% in unsprouted barley seed to 6% in 5-day sprouts."

Crude protein and fibre changes in sprouted barley

Source: Cuddeford (1989), based on data obtained by Peer and Leeson (1985).

Increase of protein is not due to new protein being manufactured by the germination process but by the washing out of starch and conversion to fiber—increasing the relative proportion of protein.

Lipolysis
An increase in lipase activity has been reported in barley by MacLeod and White (1962), as cited by Chavan and Kadam (1989). Increased lipolytic activity during germination and sprouting causes hydrolysis of triacylglycerols to glycerol and constituent fatty acids.

Increases in vitamin content
According to Chavan and Kadam (1989), most reports agree that sprouting treatment of cereal grains generally improves their vitamin value, especially the B-group vitamins. Certain vitamins such as α-tocopherol (Vitamin-E) and β-carotene (Vitamin-A precursor) are produced during the growth process (Cuddeford, 1989).

According to Shipard (2005): Sprouts provide a good supply of Vitamins A, E & C plus B complex.  Like enzymes, vitamins serve as bioactive catalysts to assist in the digestion and metabolism of feeds and the release of energy. They are also essential for the healing and repair of cells. However, vitamins are very perishable, and in general, the fresher the feeds eaten, the higher the vitamin content. The vitamin content of some seeds can increase by up to 20 times their original value within several days of sprouting. Mung Bean sprouts have B vitamin increases, compared to the dry seeds, of - B1 up 285%, B2 up 515%, B3 up 256%.  Even soaking seeds overnight in water yields greatly increased amounts of B vitamins, as well as Vitamin C.  Compared with mature plants, sprouts can yield vitamin contents 30 times higher.

Effects of sprouting kidney beans
The following table lists selected nutrients in kidney beans to show the effect of sprouting. Raw kidney beans contain high amounts of the toxin phytohemagglutinin, and the US Food and Drug Administration recommends boiling for 30 minutes to ensure they reach a sufficient temperature long enough to completely destroy the toxin. Nutrients are calculated for 100 grams of non-water components to remove water from the equation since after sprouting beans absorb a lot of water.

Mineral chelation
Shipard (2005) claims that: "When seeds are sprouted, minerals chelate or merge with protein, in a way that increases their function."

It is important to note that while these changes may sound impressive, the comparisons are between dormant non-sprouted seed to sprouted seed rather than comparisons of sprouts to mature vegetables. Comparing dry seeds to sprouts shows large increases in nutrients, whereas comparing sprouts to mature vegetables shows less of increase.  However, a sprout, just starting out in life, is likely to need, and thus have more nutrients percentage-wise of weight, than a mature vegetable.

Increase in gamma-Aminobutyric acid (GABA)
Sprouting can improve levels of gamma-Aminobutyric acid (GABA), a compound involved in the regulation of blood pressure, and promote the liberation of bioactive peptides in diverse legumes.

Health concerns

Bacterial infection

Commercially grown sprouts have been associated with multiple outbreaks of harmful bacteria, including salmonella and toxic forms of Escherichia coli. Such infections, which are so frequent in the United States that investigators call them "sproutbreaks", may be a result of contaminated seeds or of unhygienic production with high microbial counts. Sprout seeds can become contaminated in the fields where they are grown, and sanitizing steps may be unable to kill bacteria hidden in damaged seeds. A single surviving bacterium in a kilogram of seed can be enough to contaminate a whole batch of sprouts, according to the FDA.

To minimize the impact of the incidents and maintain public health, both the U.S. Food and Drug Administration (FDA) and Health Canada issued industry guidance on the safe manufacturing of edible sprouts and public education on their safe consumption.  There are also publications for hobby farmers on safely growing and consuming sprouts at home. The recommendations include development and implementation of good agricultural practices and good manufacturing practices in the production and handling of seeds and sprouts, seed disinfection treatments, and microbial testing before the product enters the food supply.

In June 2011, contaminated fenugreek sprouts (grown from seed from Egypt) in Germany was identified as the source of the 2011 E. coli O104:H4 outbreak which German officials had at first wrongly blamed on cucumbers from Spain and then on mung bean sprouts. In addition to Germany, where 3,785 cases and 45 deaths had been reported by the end of the outbreak, a handful of cases were reported in several countries including Switzerland, Poland, the Netherlands, Sweden, Denmark, the UK, Canada, and the USA. Virtually all affected people had been in Germany shortly before becoming ill.

Anti-nutritional factors
Some legumes, including sprouts, can contain toxins or anti-nutritional factors, which can be reduced by soaking, sprouting and cooking. Joy Larkcom advises that to be on the safe side "one shouldn’t eat large quantities of raw legume sprouts on a regular basis, no more than about 550g (20oz) daily".

Phytic acid, an anti-nutritional factor, occurs primarily in the seed coats and germ tissue of plant seeds. It forms insoluble or nearly insoluble compounds with many metal ions, including those of calcium, iron, magnesium, and zinc, reducing their dietary availability. Diets high in phytic acid and poor in these minerals produce mineral deficiency in experimental animals (Gontzea and Sutzescu, 1968, as cited in Chavan and Kadam, 1989). The latter authors state that the sprouting of cereals has been reported to decrease levels of phytic acid. Similarly, Shipard (2005) states that enzymes of germination and sprouting can help decrease the detrimental substances such as phytic acid. However, the amount of phytic acid reduction from soaking is only marginal, and not enough to fully counteract its anti-nutrient effects.

Canavanine
Alfalfa seeds and sprouts contain L-canavanine, which can cause lupus-like disease in primates.

European Union regulations
In order to prevent incidents like the 2011 EHEC epidemic, on 11 March 2013, the European Commission issued three new, tighter regulations.
 Regulation (EU) No 208/2013 requires that the origins of seeds must always be traceable at all stages of processing, production, and distribution. Therefore, a full description of the seeds or sprouts needs to be kept on record. (see also Article 18 of Regulation (EC) No 178/2002)
 Regulation (EU) No 209/2013 amends Regulation (EC) No 2073/2005 in respect of microbiological criteria for sprouts and the sampling rules for poultry carcasses and fresh poultry meat.
 Regulation (EU) No 211/2013 requires that imported sprouts and seeds intended for the production of sprouts have a certificate, drawn up in accordance with the model certificate in the Annex of the regulation, that serves as proof that the production process complies with the general hygiene provisions in Part A of Annex I to Regulation (EC) No 852/2004 and the traceability requirements of Implementing Regulation (EU) No 208/2013.

Types of germination

See also

 Aeroponics
 Container garden
 Gillian McKeith
 Hydroponics
 Pulse drip irrigation
 Seedling
 Seed testing
 Seed tray
 Soybean sprout
 Sprouted bread
 Urban horticulture
 Wheatgrass
 Whole grains
 Germinated brown rice

References

Bibliography
 
 
 
 NUTRITIONAL IMPROVEMENT OF CEREALS BY FERMENTATION. Source: CRITICAL REVIEWS IN FOOD SCIENCE AND NUTRITION (CHAVAN, JK; KADAM, SS, 1989)
 
 

 
Horticulture
Vegetables
Raw foodism
Asian vegetables